Daisuke Nakamura (born June 10, 1980) is a Japanese professional wrestler, mixed martial artist and submission grappler,  currently working for Pro Wrestling Noah. He has fought for DREAM, Strikeforce, M-1 Global, ZST, Cage Rage, PRIDE, Vale Tudo Japan, DEEP, K-1 and Cage Force promotions. He is the former DEEP Lightweight Champion. Nakamura is also known for his incredible armbar variations, with most of his wins coming by armbar, and is famous for his tributes to the shoot-style circuit, often wearing the style's signature kneeboots and short-tights in his fights.

He has also competed in professional wrestling, working for the U-STYLE promotion led by his trainer Kiyoshi Tamura.

Mixed martial arts career

Early career
Nakamura had his debut fight in PRIDE Fighting Championship against veteran journeyman Shannon Ritch at PRIDE The Best Vol.2. He showed his skill by submitting Ritch with an inverted armbar. He spent his next years fighting in GCM and DEEP, where he challenged for the Welterweight Championship, losing an effortful match by TKO at the third round. He would later enjoy an 8-match winning streak.

Dynamite!!
At December 31, 2008, Nakamura was slated to fight at the Dynamite!! event against Hideo Tokoro. This was a notable matchup because both Tokoro and Nakamura both sported similar fighting styles, were trained by former RINGS wrestlers and were seen by Japanese pundits as the heirs of the shoot-style circuit. The match was an exciting and fast-paced grappling contest, with Nakamura trying a flying kimura into an armbar immediately after Tokoro tried to take him down, and then Tokoro captured his back and performed a takedown similar to a German suplex. Daisuke kept trying for an armbar, and they rolled through the mat several times until Tokoro could attempt his own armbar. The bout stalled for several minutes, but it broke out again when Hideo rolled for a leglock. Nakamura, however, capitalized to transition the move into an armbar, making Tokoro finally tap out.

DEEP
He captured the DEEP Lightweight Championship against Yasuaki Kishimoto and defended it before Pancrase veteran Takafumi Ito, but he lost it to fellow Pancrase exponent Satoru Kitaoka.

Four years departed from his previous fight, Nakamura returned to face Tatsunao Nagakura at DEEP: 97 Impact. He won the fight via second-round knockout.

Nakamura then faced the reigning featherweight champion Juntaro Ushiku in a non-title bout at DEEP 100 on February 21, 2021. He won the fight via second-round knockout.

Nakamura then challenged Ushiku for the DEEP Featherweight Championship in a rematch at DEEP 102 on July 4, 2021. He lost the fight via split decision.

Nakamura faced Suguru Nii at Rizin 31 - Yokohama on October 24, 2021. He won the bout via his signature flying armbar in the first round.

Nakamura faced Michihiro Omigawa at DEEP 106 on February 26, 2022. He won the fight via armbar in the third.

Nakamura faced Sora Yamamoto at Rizin 34 on March 20, 2022. He lost the fight by split decision.

Nakamura faced Yuta Sato at Deep 108 Impact on July 10, 2022. He won the bout by unanimous decision.

Nakamura faced Kouya Kanda at Deep 110 Impact on November 12, 2022. He lost the bout by unanimous decision.

Nakamura faced Tatsuhiko Iwamoto on December 18, 2022 at DEEP Osaka Impact 2022 4th Round, winning the bout via reverse heel hook in the second round.

Nakamura faced Min Woo Kim at Black Combat 5: Song of the Sword on February 4, 2023. He was choked out in the third round via rear-naked choke.

Championships
DEEP
DEEP Lightweight Championship (One time; former)
One successful title defense

Mixed martial arts record

|-
|Loss
|align=center| 34–23–1
|Min Woo Kim
|Technical Submission (rear-naked choke)
|Black Combat 5
|
|align=center|3
|align=center|3:49
|Incheon, South Korea
|
|-
|Win
|align=center|34–22–1
|Tatsuhiko Iwamoto
|Submission (reverse heel hook)
|DEEP Osaka Impact 2022 4th Round
|
|align=center|2
|align=center|2:50
|Fukushima, Japan
|
|-
|Loss
|align=center| 33–22–1
|Kouya Kanda
|Decision (unanimous)
|DEEP 110 Impact
|
|align=center|3
|align=center|5:00
|Tokyo, Japan 
|
|-
|Win
|align=center| 33–21–1
|Yuta Sato
|Decision (unanimous)
|DEEP 108 Impact
|
|align=center|3
|align=center|5:00
|Tokyo, Japan
|
|-
| Loss
| align=center| 32–21–1
| Sora Yamamoto
| Decision (split)
| Rizin 34
| 
| align=center| 3
| align=center| 5:00
| Osaka, Japan
| 
|-
| Win
| align=center| 32–20–1
| Michihiro Omigawa
| Submission (armbar)
| DEEP 106 Impact
| 
| align=center| 3
| align=center| 0:51
| Tokyo, Japan
| 
|-
| Win
| align=center| 31–20–1
|Suguru Nii
|Submission (flying armbar)
|Rizin 31
|
|align=center|1
|align=center|2:16
|Yokohama, Japan
|
|-
| Loss
| align=center| 
| Juntaro Ushiku
| Decision (split)
| DEEP: 102 Impact
| 
| align=center| 3
| align=center| 5:00
| Tokyo, Japan
| 
|-
| Win
| align=center| 30–19–1
| Juntaro Ushiku
| KO (knee)
| DEEP 100 Impact - 20th Anniversary
| 
| align=center| 2
| align=center| 0:26
| Tokyo, Japan
| 
|-
| Win
| align=center| 29–19–1
| Tatsunao Nagakura
| KO (punch)
| DEEP: 97 Impact
| 
| align=center| 2
| align=center| 0:16
| Tokyo, Japan
|
|-
| Loss
| align=center| 28–19–1
| Tsogookhuu Amarsanaa
| KO (punch)
| MGL-1 Fighting Championship: MGL-1 vs. Deep
| 
| align=center| 3
| align=center| 1:50
| Ulaanbaatar, Mongolia
|
|-
| Loss
| align=center| 28–18–1
| Yuki Kawana
| TKO (punches)
| Vale Tudo Japan: VTJ 7th
| 
| align=center| 3
| align=center| 2:26
| Tokyo, Japan
|
|-
| Loss
| align=center| 28–17–1
| Yuki Okano
| Decision (unanimous)
| DEEP: 72 Impact
| 
| align=center| 3
| align=center| 5:00
| Tokyo, Japan
|
|-
| Loss
| align=center| 28–16–1
| Eiji Ishikawa
| Decision (unanimous)
| Tribe Tokyo Fight: TTF Challenge 04
| 
| align=center| 3
| align=center| 5:00
| Tokyo, Japan
|
|-
| Win
| align=center| 28–15–1
| Yoichi Fukumoto
| TKO (punches)
| DEEP: 70 Impact
| 
| align=center| 3
| align=center| 0:11
| Tokyo, Japan
|
|-
| Draw
| align=center| 27–15-1
| Shinji Sasaki
| Draw (split)
| DEEP: 69 Impact
| 
| align=center| 3
| align=center| 5:00
| Tokyo, Japan
|
|-
| Loss
| align=center| 27–15
| Mizuto Hirota
| Decision (unanimous)
| DEEP: 66 Impact
| 
| align=center| 3
| align=center| 5:00
| Tokyo, Japan
|
|-
| Loss
| align=center| 27–14
| Satoru Kitaoka
| Decision (unanimous)
| DEEP: 62 Impact
| 
| align=center| 3
| align=center| 5:00
| Tokyo, Japan
| Lost the DEEP Lightweight Championship.
|-
| Win
| align=center| 27–13
| Takafumi Ito
| TKO (flying knee and punches)
| DEEP: 60 Impact
| 
| align=center| 2
| align=center| 0:35
| Tokyo, Japan
| Defended the DEEP Lightweight Championship.
|-
| Win
| align=center| 26–13
| Yasuaki Kishimoto
| Decision (unanimous)
| DEEP: 58 Impact
| 
| align=center| 3
| align=center| 5:00
| Tokyo, Japan
| Won the DEEP Lightweight Championship.
|-
| Win
| align=center| 25–13
| Akihiro Gono
| Decision (unanimous)
| DEEP: 57 Impact
| 
| align=center| 3
| align=center| 5:00
| Tokyo, Japan
| 
|-
| Win
| align=center| 24–13
| Chang Hyun-Kim
| Submission (armbar)
| Deep: Cage Impact 2011 in Tokyo, 1st Round
| 
| align=center| 3
| align=center| 3:19
| Tokyo, Japan
|
|-
| Loss
| align=center| 23–13
| Katsunori Kikuno
| Decision (unanimous)
| DREAM: Fight for Japan!
| 
| align=center| 3
| align=center| 5:00
| Saitama, Japan
|
|-
| Win
| align=center| 23–12
| Toshikazu Iseno
| Submission (flying armbar)
| DEEP: 51 Impact
| 
| align=center| 2
| align=center| 1:54
| Tokyo, Japan
|
|-
| Win
| align=center| 22–12
| Jai Bradney
| Submission (armbar)
| Nitro MMA 1
| 
| align=center| 1
| align=center| 3:40
| Brisbane, Queensland, Australia
|
|-
| Win
| align=center| 21–12
| Ganjo Tentsuku
| Decision (unanimous)
| ASTRA
| 
| align=center| 3
| align=center| 5:00
| Tokyo, Japan
|
|-
| Loss
| align=center| 20–12
| Justin Wilcox
| Decision (unanimous)
| Strikeforce: Evolution
| 
| align=center| 3
| align=center| 5:00
| San Jose, California, United States
|
|-
| Loss
| align=center| 20–11
| Naoyuki Kotani
| Submission (leg scissor choke)
| ZST.22
| 
| align=center| 1
| align=center| 1:37
| Tokyo, Japan
|
|-
| Win
| align=center| 20–10
| Ferrid Kheder
| Decision (unanimous)
| M-1 Global: Breakthrough
| 
| align=center| 3
| align=center| 5:00
| Kansas City, Missouri, United States
|
|-
| Loss
| align=center| 19–10
| Mitsuhiro Ishida
| Decision (unanimous)
| DREAM.7
| 
| align=center| 2
| align=center| 5:00
| Saitama, Saitama, Japan
|
|-
| Win
| align=center| 19–9
| Hideo Tokoro
| Submission (armbar)
| Fields Dynamite!! 2008
| 
| align=center| 1
| align=center| 2:23
| Saitama, Saitama, Japan
|
|-
| Win
| align=center| 18–9
| Carlos Valeri
| Submission (flying armbar)
| M-1 Challenge 8: USA
| 
| align=center| 1
| align=center| 0:26
| Kansas City, Missouri, United States
|
|-
| Win
| align=center| 17–9
| Wim Deputter
| Decision (unanimous)
| M-1 Challenge 6: Korea
| 
| align=center| 2
| align=center| 5:00
| Seoul, South Korea
|
|-
| Win
| align=center| 16–9
| Andy Ologun
| Submission (flying armbar)
| DREAM 5: Lightweight Grand Prix 2008 Final Round
| 
| align=center| 1
| align=center| 3:41
| Osaka, Japan
|
|-
| Win
| align=center| 15–9
| Bogdan Cristea
| Decision (unanimous)
| M-1 Challenge 5: Japan
| 
| align=center| 2
| align=center| 5:00
| Tokyo, Japan
|
|-
| Win
| align=center| 14–9
| Jung Bu-Kyung
| KO (punch)
| DREAM 3: Lightweight Grand Prix 2008 Second Round
| 
| align=center| 2
| align=center| 1:05
| Saitama, Saitama, Japan
|
|-
| Win
| align=center| 13–9
| Yuri Ivlev
| Decision (majority)
| M-1 Challenge 2: Russia
| 
| align=center| 2
| align=center| 5:00
| Saint Petersburg, Russia
|
|-
| Win
| align=center| 12–9
| A Sol Kwon
| Submission (armbar)
| HERO'S 2007 in Korea
| 
| align=center| 3
| align=center| 3:09
| Seoul, South Korea
|
|-
| Loss
| align=center| 11–9
| Vítor Ribeiro
| Technical Submission (kimura)
| Cage Rage 19
| 
| align=center| 1
| align=center| 3:55
| London, England
| For the Cage Rage Lightweight Championship.
|-
| Win
| align=center| 11–8
| Seichi Ikemoto
| Submission (armbar)
| PRIDE Bushido 12
| 
| align=center| 1
| align=center| 3:36
| Aichi Prefecture, Japan
|
|-
| Win
| align=center| 10–8
| Michael Johnson
| Submission (kimura)
| Cage Rage 16
| 
| align=center| 1
| align=center| 2:54
| London, England
|
|-
| Win
| align=center| 9–8
| Hirohide Fujinuma
| Submission (armbar)
| DEEP: 23 Impact
| 
| align=center| 1
| align=center| 0:52
| Tokyo, Japan
|
|-
| Loss
| align=center| 8–8
| Hidehiko Hasegawa
| Decision (unanimous)
| DEEP: 22 Impact
| 
| align=center| 2
| align=center| 5:00
| Yokohama, Japan
|
|-
| Loss
| align=center| 8–7
| Marcus Aurélio
| Decision (unanimous)
| PRIDE Bushido 6
| 
| align=center| 2
| align=center| 5:00
| Yokohama, Japan
|
|-
| Loss
| align=center| 8–6
| Jutaro Nakao
| TKO (punches)
| DEEP: 16th Impact
| 
| align=center| 3
| align=center| 3:16
| Tokyo, Japan
| For the DEEP Welterweight Championship.
|-
| Win
| align=center| 8–5
| Yuji Hoshino
| KO (punch)
| DEEP: 16th Impact
| 
| align=center| 1
| align=center| 4:33
| Tokyo, Japan
|
|-
| Win
| align=center| 7–5
| Tetsuya Onose
| TKO (punches)
| DEEP: 15th Impact
| 
| align=center| 1
| align=center| 0:50
| Tokyo, Japan
|
|-
| Loss
| align=center| 6–5
| Keita Nakamura
| Decision (unanimous)
| GCM: Demolition 040408
| 
| align=center| 2
| align=center| 5:00
| Tokyo, Japan
|
|-
| Loss
| align=center| 6–4
| Hikaru Sato
| Decision (unanimous)
| GCM: Demolition 040118
| 
| align=center| 2
| align=center| 5:00
| Tokyo, Japan
|
|-
| Win
| align=center| 6–3
| Kazuhiro Hanada
| Submission (armbar)
| GCM: Demolition 030923
| 
| align=center| 1
| align=center| 4:21
| Tokyo, Japan
|
|-
| Win
| align=center| 5–3
| Yutaro Miyamoto
| TKO (knees to the body)
| GCM: Demolition 030629
| 
| align=center| 2
| align=center| 0:38
| Tokyo, Japan
|
|-
| Loss
| align=center| 4–3
| Hidehiko Hasegawa
| Decision (unanimous)
| GCM: Demolition 030323
| 
| align=center| 2
| align=center| 5:00
| Tokyo, Japan
|
|-
| Win
| align=center| 4–2
| Sen Nakadai
| Submission (flying armbar)
| Cage Force
| 
| align=center| 1
| align=center| 2:54
| Tokyo, Japan
|
|-
| Win
| align=center| 3–2
| Nobuhiro Tsurumaki
| Submission (armbar)
| GCM: Demolition 030126
| 
| align=center| 1
| align=center| 2:06
| Tokyo, Japan
|
|-
| Loss
| align=center| 2–2
| Dai Moriyama
| Decision (unanimous)
| DEEP: 7th Impact
| 
| align=center| 2
| align=center| 5:00
| Tokyo, Japan
|
|-
| Win
| align=center| 2–1
| Hitoyo Kimura
| Submission (armbar)
| DEEP: 7th Impact
| 
| align=center| 2
| align=center| 0:50
| Tokyo, Japan
|
|-
| Loss
| align=center| 1–1
| Yuji Hisamatsu
| Decision (unanimous)
| Cage Force
| 
| align=center| 2
| align=center| 5:00
| Tokyo, Japan
|
|-
| Win
| align=center| 1–0
| Shannon Ritch
| Submission (reverse armbar)
| PRIDE The Best Vol.2
| 
| align=center| 1
| align=center| 4:28
| Tokyo, Japan
|

Submission grappling record 

|- style="text-align:center; background:#f0f0f0;"
| style="border-style:none none solid solid; "|Result
| style="border-style:none none solid solid; "|Opponent
| style="border-style:none none solid solid; "|Method
| style="border-style:none none solid solid; "|Event
| style="border-style:none none solid solid; "|Date
| style="border-style:none none solid solid; "|Round
| style="border-style:none none solid solid; "|Time
| style="border-style:none none solid solid; "|Notes
|-
|Win|| Yukinari Tamura || Draw || Quintet Fight Night 4 || November 30, 2019 || 1 || N/A ||
|-
|Win|| Yutaka Saito || Submission (kneebar) || Quintet Fight Night 4 || November 30, 2019 || 1 || N/A ||
|-
|Win|| Yutaka Kobayashi || Submission (flying armbar) || Fighting NEXUS || September 22, 2019 || 1|| 10:18||
|-
|Draw|| Yoshiyuki Yoshida || Draw || Quintet Fight Night 2 || February 3, 2019 || 1|| 10:00||
|-
|Draw|| Antoine Jaoude || Draw || Quintet 3 || October 5, 2018 || 1|| ||
|-
|Draw|| PJ Barch || Draw || Quintet 2 || July 16, 2018 || 1|| 8:00||
|-
|Loss|| Roberto Souza || Submission (rear-naked cho) || Quintet Fight Night 1 || June 9, 2018|| 1|| 1:29||
|-
|Win|| Masanori Kanehara || Submission (armbar) || Quintet Fight Night 1 || June 9, 2018|| 1|| 2:33||
|-
|Loss|| Dan Strauss || Submission (rear-naked choke) || Quintet || April 11, 2018|| 1|| ||
|-
|Draw|| Michihiro Omigawa || Draw || Quintet || April 11, 2018|| 1|| 10:00||

External links

References

Living people
Japanese male mixed martial artists
Lightweight mixed martial artists
Mixed martial artists utilizing shoot wrestling
Japanese male sport wrestlers
1980 births
Sportspeople from Tokyo
Deep (mixed martial arts) champions